Hoseynabad-e Derakhti (also Romanized as Ḩoseynābād-e Derakhtī and Ḩoseynābād-e Darakhtī; also known as Husainābād) is a village in Posht Rud Rural District, in the Central District of Narmashir County, Kerman Province, Iran. At the 2006 census, its population was 321, in 86 families.

References 

Populated places in Narmashir County